Cornélio Pires (July 13, 1884 in Tietê – February 17, 1958 in São Paulo) was a journalist, writer, and Brazilian folklorist.

Cornélio Pires was the most important studious of the country man, he understood him, and was the first to launch, in 78 rpm records, the country music, called today "roots music", as opposed to country music.

Cornélio Pires is a cousin of the writers Elsie Lessa, Orígenes Lessa, Ivan Lessa and Sergio Pinheiro Lopes. Cornélio is also the uncle of the spiritist journalist and thinker José Herculano Pires.

1884 births
1958 deaths
People from Tietê, São Paulo
Brazilian journalists
Brazilian folklorists
20th-century journalists